Barakah is a 2016 studio album by British singer-songwriter Sami Yusuf. It was released on 1 February 2016 on Andante Records.

It is also marketed as the first of a series of recordings as Spiritique Collection (Vol. 1) to be followed by further recordings under that Spiritique label.

The songs are an inner journey of self-discovery, travelling to various locations and submerged in the beauty of Sufi musical traditions and inspired by the diverse Islamic musical traditions that have honoured Allah, the Prophet Muhammad and the Sacred over many centuries.

Yusuf also released accompanying music videos for a number of the tracks, notably the single Inna Fil Jannati as well as for Taha, Hamziyya, Fiyyashiyya and Ben Yürürüm Yane Yane.

Track listing

References

2016 albums
Sami Yusuf albums